Louis-Marie-Florent de Lomont d'Haraucourt, marquis later duc du Châtelet (20 November 1727, Semur-en-Auxois – 13 December 1793, Paris), was an aristocratic French Army general and diplomat of the Ancien Régime.

The Duke served as Governor of Semur-en-Auxois in Burgundy as well as Ambassador to the Court of St James's, besides other appointments. He was appointed to command the Regiment of French Guards shortly before the outbreak of the Revolution in 1789.  Châtelet was subsequently imprisoned and guillotined, in 1793 aged 66.

Family 
The son and heir of the noble and ancient Châtelet family, his mother, Émilie du Châtelet, famously was a scientist and the lover of Voltaire.

On 20 June 1725, his father Florent-Claude du Chastelet married Gabrielle-Émilie, daughter of Louis Nicolas le Tonnelier de Breteuil. Like many marriages among the French nobility, theirs was an arranged marriage. The couple found they had little in common, but proprieties were observed in accordance with contemporary norms.

The Marquis and Marchioness produced three children: Françoise-Gabrielle-Pauline (30 June 1726 – 1754, married in 1743 to Alfonso Carafa, Duca di Montenero), Louis-Marie-Florent (later duc du Châtelet, November 20, 1727 - guillotined on 13 December 1793) and Victor-Esprit (born on 11 April 1733 and died on 29 August 1734). After bearing three children, Émilie, Marquise (Marchioness) du Châtelet, considered her marital responsibilities fulfilled and reached an agreement with her husband to live separate lives while still maintaining one household.

Marriage 

The Duke of Châtelet married, in 1752, Diane-Adélaïde de Rochechouart (died 1794) but they had no children. The Duke adopted his wife’s niece instead, also called Diane-Adélaïde, who was daughter of François-Jacques de Damas, marquis d'Antigny. She was born in Paris on 25 January 1761.

Having married, in 1777, Charles-François, comte de Simiane, thereby becoming styled Countess by courtesy, it soon became apparent that she had married a homosexual. Thereafter she sought comfort elsewhere with Gilbert du Motier, marquis de La Fayette who had served in the American Revolutionary War together with her husband (François, comte de Simiane died on 27 March 1787). The Duke also had an affair with her for the decade prior to his death in 1793. She never remarried and spent the remainder of her years at Chateau de Cirey, until her death (April 9, 1835).

Political role 
In 1787 Châtelet was appointed to preside over the provincial assembly of the Ile-de-France, one of a number called to consider political and economic reform. The assembly consisted of representatives of all three recognized orders (clergy, nobility and bourgeois). They met in Melun on 11 July with Châtelet making the open address.

Military role 
In 1788 the Duke took command as colonel of the Regiment of French Guards, "succeeding but not replacing" the respected Duke de Biron.
This elite unit of the Royal Military Household was permanently stationed in Paris and had many ties with the local population. Châtelet introduced "Prussian" codes of military discipline, which included harsh measures of physical punishment. At the same time he neglected to enforce greater professionalism amongst the aristocratic officer corps, who were often absent on leave and who left day-to-day administration of the regiment to its sergeants and corporals. As a result, obedience to orders amongst the rank and file weakened in the face of the increased disturbances in Paris during June–July 1789.

Revolution and death 
On 12 July the unpopular Châtelet was recognized in a Paris street and pursued by a hostile crowd. He was rescued by a detachment of French Guards but two days later most of the regiment went over to the revolution, joining in the storming of the Bastille.  Châtelet was subsequently arrested and, following a period in prison, guillotined on 13 December 1793. With his death the Châtelet family came to an end - there were 11 branches but all of them had died out, and he was the last member of the last surviving branch.

Honours and titles 
  Duc de France (Marquis before 1770)
  Grand-croix, Ordre de Saint-Louis 
  Chevalier, Ordre de Malte
  Chevalier, Ordre du Saint-Esprit

See also
 Hôtel du Châtelet
 House of Lorraine
 List of Ambassadors of France to the United Kingdom

References

Sources
 Hubert Saget Louis Marie Florent du Châtelet

1727 births
1793 deaths
People from Côte-d'Or
Peers of France
French marquesses
French Army officers
Cavalry commanders
Ambassadors of France to Austria
Ambassadors of France to Great Britain
18th-century French diplomats
Dukes of Châtelet
Knights of Malta
Knights of the Order of Saint Louis
French nobility
French people executed by guillotine during the French Revolution